Marquess of Buckingham may refer to:
 George Villiers, 1st Duke of Buckingham (1592–1628) Marquess of Buckingham from 1618 until elevated to Duke of Buckingham in 1623
 George Nugent-Temple-Grenville, 1st Marquess of Buckingham (1753–1813), created Marquess of Buckingham in 1784
 Richard Temple-Nugent-Brydges-Chandos-Grenville, 1st Duke of Buckingham and Chandos (1776–1839) Marquess of Buckingham from 1813 until elevated to Duke of Buckingham in 1822

See also
 Duke of Buckingham created four times

Extinct marquessates in the Peerage of England
Extinct marquessates in the Peerage of Great Britain
Noble titles created in 1618
Noble titles created in 1784